Upper Peru is a name for the land that was governed by the Real Audiencia of Charcas. The name originated in Buenos Aires towards the end of the 18th century after the Audiencia of Charcas was transferred from the Viceroyalty of Peru to the Viceroyalty of the Río de la Plata in 1776. It comprised the governorships of Potosí, La Paz, Cochabamba, Chiquitos, Moxos and Charcas (since renamed Sucre).

Following the Bolivian War of Independence, the region became an independent country and was renamed Bolivia in honor of Simón Bolívar.

History 
By 1821, the Spanish colonial empire in Latin America was falling apart because of the Napoleonic occupation of Spain and the troops of generals Bolivar and Sucre, who had already liberated Venezuela, Colombia and Ecuador, were already approaching the Upper Peru region.

Fearing bloodshed that the libertarian troops could cause the local population, in June 1822 the three governors of Upper Peru departments gathered in Cuiabá (Captaincy of Mato Grosso, Brazil) and asked the governor to take sides with the Prince Regent (future Emperor Pedro I) to occupy the territory for the United Kingdom of Portugal, Brazil and the Algarves. It was better (thought the governors) to be occupied by a monarchical State than to entertain the idea of rule by a fragile and uncertain republic.

Immediately, in July of that year, the governor of Mato Grosso sent to Upper Peru the troops stationed in the captaincy and closed the borders to stop the advance of the libertarian troops. He sent to the Prince the proposal of the local authorities and the dispatch order of the troops.

The letter reached Emperor Pedro I only in November 1822, when Brazil had already declared independence and, worse, Brazil was not interested in attaching that territory, because the new country was more concerned with pacifying the northern and northeastern provinces. Thus, the order given by the Emperor was to call back the troops (leaving the way clear for the libertarians to occupy these territories) claiming that "Brazil does not interfere in foreign affairs."

This episode is poorly documented, the curious thing is that the Generals Antonio Jose de Sucre and Simón Bolívar, knowing what was happening, managed to send diplomats in record time to Rio de Janeiro and these diplomats arrived even faster than the letter from the governor of Mato Grosso, so the result was that when he got the letter, the Emperor was already "head made" and the evacuation order was already given.

Spanish province of Charcas 
Initially, the province of Charcas was under the administration of the Viceroyalty of Peru until 1776 when the Viceroyalty of the Río de la Plata was established.

Río de la Plata provinces of Alto Perú 
The Assembly of Buenos Aires advanced to the province of Charcas as part of the Viceroyalty of Río de la Plata and had elected representatives of the Provinces of Upper Peru for the Congress of the United Provinces of Río de la Plata.

Counterrevolution of Alto Perú 
When the Viceroyalty of Río de la Plata gained independence, the Viceroy Abascal incorporated Upper Peru to the Viceroyalty of Peru including the province of Charcas.

Portuguese intervention in Alto Perú 
The occupation occurred in the region Alto Perú (now Bolivia) between July and December 1822, which mobilized the Portuguese royal troops stationed in the Captaincy of Mato Grosso and occupied three of the Peru departments: La Paz, Santa Cruz de la Sierra and the so-called Department Maritmo (Atacama) .

Colombian occupation of Alto Perú 
Between 1823 and 1828 Colombian troops occupied Alto Perú with the leadership of marshal Antonio José de Sucre, born in Cumaná, as continuation of the Campaigns of the South. The Republic of Bolivar (based on the Alto Perú) was considered to be a satellite state of the Gran Colombia.

Claims by Argentina and Perú over Alto Perú 
Argentina and Peru claimed some territories of Alto Perú for historical reasons.

References 

 

Colonial Bolivia
Viceroyalty of Peru
Viceroyalty of the Río de la Plata
Regions of Bolivia
Spanish-speaking countries and territories
Historical regions